The  is a Japanese international school located in Abu Dhabi. It is located in the former Umm Habiba Girls School. It is adjacent to the Lycée Français Théodore Monod (LfTM), the French international school.

References

Further reading
 平山 和良 (前アブダビ日本人学校教諭・世田谷区立明正小学校教諭). "アブダビ日本人学校における体育科の実践." 在外教育施設における指導実践記録 25, 6–9, 2002. Tokyo Gakugei University. See profile at CiNii.

External links

 Japanese School in Abu Dhabi 
 English information
 Japanese School in Abu Dhabi  (Archive)

International schools in Abu Dhabi
Schools in the Emirate of Abu Dhabi
Abu Dhabi
Abu Dhabi
Private schools in the United Arab Emirates
Educational institutions with year of establishment missing